Roberto Carballés Baena was the defending champion but chose not to defend his title.

Jaume Munar won the title after defeating Pedro Sousa 7–6(7–3), 6–2 in the final.

Seeds

Draw

Finals

Top half

Bottom half

References

External links
Main draw
Qualifying draw

Lisboa Belém Open - Singles
2020 Singles
2020 Lisboa Belém Open